The women's 10000 metres elimination races event at the 2017 Summer Universiade was held on 21 August at the Yingfeng Riverside Park Roller Sports Rink (A).

Record

Results 

Note: EL=Eliminated.

References 

Roller sports at the 2017 Summer Universiade